Martha Stewart Leitch (June 27, 1918 – December 20, 2015) was a Canadian architect who graduated from the University of Toronto and later served as its Dean of Engineering.

Career
Preferring to be known as "Marty", Leitch graduated with a Bachelors in Architecture from the University of Toronto and attended University of Cambridge for advanced studies after being chosen as a Commonwealth Scholar. She achieved Professional Engineer standing while teach at the University of Toronto and eventually became Dean of Engineering where she was a mentored hundreds of students over the span of her career.

Leitch entered into a profession of architecture and construction that was traditionally difficult for women, however she was adamant in staying in these professions "come hell or high water". During her career, she founded a civil engineering firm with her husband, acted as a lecturer, assistant professor, and Dean at the University of Toronto, became a fellow at the Royal Architectural Institute of Canada, and was member of the Ontario Association of Architects.

References

1918 births
2015 deaths
Artists from Nova Scotia
People from Halifax, Nova Scotia
Canadian women architects
Canadian women artists
University of Toronto alumni
20th-century Canadian architects
20th-century Canadian women
Alumni of the University of Cambridge
Canadian expatriates in the United Kingdom